Bruno Demetrio Iotti or simply Bruno Iotti (born January 15, 1987 in Jundiaí), is a Brazilian midfielder.

Honours 
Sergipe
 Campeonato Sergipano: 2016

People from Jundiaí
1987 births
Living people
Brazilian footballers
Paraná Clube players
Ituano FC players
Iraty Sport Club players
Clube Atlético Bragantino players
Associação Olímpica de Itabaiana players
Club Sportivo Sergipe players
Association football midfielders
Footballers from São Paulo (state)